The Syrian serin (Serinus syriacus) is a brightly coloured small passerine bird in the finch family Fringillidae.

Description 
The Syrian serin is prettily coloured with bright yellow and pale grey feathers. The eyes are large and are surrounded by a bright yellow ring. The beak is grey and the legs are pale pinkish-grey. It has a long trilling call and may also chirp and twitter.

Distribution and habitat 
Syrian serins breed in Syria, Lebanon, Israel and Jordan, at altitudes of between 900 and 1,900 metres.  The population in Jordan makes local movements in winter, but the birds of Lebanon, Israel and Syria migrate to wintering grounds in Egypt, Turkey and Iraq.  They inhabit rocky areas with oak and conifer shrubs or trees and frequent grasslands and fields feeding mainly on the seeds of annuals and grasses. In Southwestern Jordan, its main diet during winter is the seeds of Artemisia.

Phylogeny 
This species is phylogenetically included within the group of Serinus alario now thriving around the southern tip of Africa, together with Serinus canicollis (African distribution) and Serinus pusillus (Asian distribution) Arnaiz-Villena et al., 1999 and Arnaiz-Villena et al., 2006

Breeding 
Males court females with a song display, and each pair builds a nest in a tree once the snow has begun to melt in April or May. Four pale blue, glossy eggs are laid in April and May, and the female incubates these for 12–14 days. The young fledge after just 14–16 days and the parents then move up to around 1,750 metres in July and August to produce a second clutch. When conditions allow, the pair can produce three broods. In southwest Jordan, most pairs apparently breed only once per year as suitable breeding habitat does not exist at higher elevations.

Conservation 
The species is evaluated by IUCN as Vulnerable. The population is declining due to logging, livestock production and hunting.

References 

A. Arnaiz-Villena, M. Alvarez-Tejado, V. Ruiz-del-Valle, C. García-de-la-Torre, P. Varela, M. J. Recio, S. Ferre, and J. Martinez-Laso (1999)."Rapid Radiation of Canaries (Genus Serinus)"(PDF). Mol. Biol. Evol. 16(1): 2–11.
 Jorge Zamora, Juan Moscoso, Valentin Ruiz-del-Valle, Ernesto Lowy, Juan I. Serrano-Vela, Juan Ira-Cachafeiro, Antonio Arnaiz-Villena (2006)."Conjoint mitochondrial phylogenetic trees for canaries Serinus spp. and goldfinches Carduelis spp. show several specific polytomies."(PDF). Ardeola 53(1): 1-17.
 Khoury, F. (1998): Habitat selection by Syrian Serin Serinus syriacus in SW Jordan. Sandgrouse 20(2): 87–93.
 Khoury, F. (2000). The impact of drought conditions on the winter distribution and population of Syrian Serin Serinus syriacus in south-west Jordan. Sandgrouse 22 (1): 64–66.
 Khoury, F. (2001). The breeding ecology of Syrian Serin Serinus syriacus in Jordan. Sandgrouse 23(1): 68–69.
 Khoury, F. (2003). Feeding ecology of Syrian Serin Serinus syriacus in SW Jordan. Ecology of Birds (Oekologie der Voegel) 25: 5-35.

Syrian serin
Birds of Western Asia
Birds of the Middle East
Syrian serin
Syrian serin